Physophora hydrostatica, also known as hula skirt siphonophore, is a species of siphonophore in the family Physophoridae.

References 

Physophoridae
Animals described in 1775